The 2012 ITF Wheelchair Tennis Tour is the global elite professional wheelchair tennis circuit organized by the International Tennis Federation (ITF) for the 2012 tennis season. The 2012 ITF Wheelchair Tennis Tour calendar comprises the Grand Slam tournaments, the Wheelchair Tennis Masters, the ITF Super Series, the ITF 1 series, the ITF 2 series, the ITF 3 series, and the ITF Futures series.

Schedule
This is the complete schedule of Grand Slams and events in the ITF Masters Series, ITF Super Series and the ITF 1 Series on the 2012 calendar.

Key

January

February

March

April

May

June

July

August

September

October

November

References

Wheelchair tennis tournaments
2012 in tennis